Shattuara, also spelled Šattuara, was a king of the Hurrian kingdom of Mittani c. 1305-1285 BC.

Shattuara became a vassal of the Assyrian king Adad-nirari I (1263 BC) after the latter defeated him. In an inscription made by Adad-nirari I, he is said to have rebelled against his lord, but was captured and his oath of loyalty was renewed.

A later king also called Shattuara is suggested to have ruled Hanigalbat during the reign of the Assyrian king Shalmaneser I (1263-1233 BC). In an Assyrian inscription, King Shattuara of Hanigalbat is said to have waged war against Shalmaneser I. However, it seems more likely this event is a recapitulation of the revolt against Adad-nirari I, either by Shattuara or his son Wasashatta.

See also

Mitanni

References

Hurrian kings
14th-century BC rulers